Deh Now-e Kheyari (also Romanized as Deh Now-e Kheyārī; also known as Deh Now and Deh Now-e Pā’īn) is a village in Dehaj Rural District, Dehaj District, Shahr-e Babak County, Kerman Province, Iran. At the 2006 census, its population was 202, in 30 families.

References 

Populated places in Shahr-e Babak County